Weygand is a surname. Notable people with the surname include:

 Conrad Weygand (1890–1945), German chemist
 Maxime Weygand (1867–1965), French military commander
 Robert Weygand (born 1948), American politician
 Zina Weygand, French historian

See also
 Wiegand
 Weigand
 Wigand
Surnames from given names